Eight teams from seven countries will participate in the 16th edition of the Turkmenistan President's Cup, which will take place in Ashgabat's Olympic Stadium between February 20 and 28. The group toppers clash in the final and stand to win $20,000 while the runners-up get half that amount. The third-placed team will receive $5,000.

Participating teams

Group stage
All times are local (UTC+5)

Group A

Results

Group B

Results

Knockout stage

Semi finals

Third-place play-off

Final

Top scorers

2010
President's Cup